Laawaris is a 1999 Indian romance film directed by Shrikant Sharma. It stars Jackie Shroff, Dimple Kapadia, Akshaye Khanna and Manisha Koirala.

Plot
Vijay is a local hooligan working for Mr. Karla and is in charge of taking "protection money" from people of that locality. A lawyer called Anand moves into that place and refuses to give Vijay money when that reaches Mr. Karla's ears he gets pissed and asks Vijay to settle this case quickly. Vijay burns Anand's motorcycle to try to force him to give him money. Anand refuses again and Anand tries to convince Vijay to quit that job and Vijay challenges Anand to fight with him. Anand does not touch the drunk Vijay but Vijay gets beaten down by his own carelessness.

Later, Vijay goes to steal a motorcycle for Anand as Anand's son made a complaint to him that he has to carry his 15 kilos bag to school now as Vijay burned down Anand's motorcycle. Anand refuses to take the bike and police come to arrest the gang. The gang gets bailed before the complaint is even written. Mr. Karla gets angry at this and tells Vijay to settle this case as quickly as possible. Vijay beats Anand with his gang.

Kavita goes to confront Vijay. Vijay goes to visit Anand at the hospital but Anand sends him away. Meanwhile, Vijay meets Anshu who works with Anand, unknown to him. Vijay hides his real self (Captain Dada) in front of Anshu and the two start liking each other. Vijay does such after having some small conversations with Kavita who he now addresses as sister. Seeing how Anshu gets lost in the air, Anand asks Anshu to make a meeting with her boyfriend and him. That day, Anand reveals the truth to Anshu. Anshu is heartbroken and calls it an end to their relationship. Also earlier that day, Vijay asked Mr. Karla to release him because he wanted a new beginning for Anshu which the latter made it seem he did but he didn't.

Hearing that the two has officially ended, Mr. Karla and his right-hand decide to make Raj and Anshu marry each other as Anshu is the police commissioner's niece. Mr. Karla also sends another man to collect "protection money" in Vijay's locality. Vijay fights with the new man. The commissioner gets Vijay jailed after hearing Mr. Karla angry at the new man. Kavita asks Anand to release Vijay and Anand releases him as he can see Vijay's want to change himself.

Later, Vijay meets Anshu and settle everything between them. They decide to escape when the commissioner catches them but Pushpa, Anshu's aunt who has always supported and protected Anshu from her abusive husband, comes pointing a gun at the commissioner and tells them to run away. The commissioner orders an Inspector to arrest Vijay and Anand. The news reached Mr. Karla and his son Raj. When on the road, Vijay escapes with Anshu without Anand and Gaflet, who was granting him a house to live through the night.

Karla's right man finds the two and at the same time the Inspector. Before the Inspector puts Vijay in jail, Raj comes and gets killed in the fuss. The Inspector gives the tree his jeep. Anand goes to take his wife and son away from that colony as their lives are in danger. Anand and some of Vijay's friends fight against Karla's goons and during that Addha loses his life. Karla takes the hospital Anand is in custody. The commissioner and police force come at the hospital and the fight game begins. Mr. Karla is hanged to death through his own choices. The movie ends with everyone together and happy.

Cast
 Jackie Shroff as Advocate Anand Saxena 
 Dimple Kapadia as Mrs. Kavita Anand Saxena
 Akshaye Khanna as Captain Dada / Vijay
 Manisha Koirala as Anshu Mehra 
 Johnny Lever as Gaflat Bhai
 Govind Namdev as Kalra Uncle 
 Dinesh Hingoo as Rustom
 Pramod Moutho as Commissioner Mehra
 Raza Murad as Inspector Khan
 Parmeet Sethi as Raj Kalra
 Rajesh Joshi as Addha
 Anita Kanwal

Soundtrack
The music was directed by Rajesh Roshan. The song "Tumne Jo Kahan" was a copy of Barbie Girl by Aqua

Reception
Sharmila Taliculam of  Rediff.com wrote ″It has the usual street fights, drama, emotion, and enough tear-jerking scenes to make you suspect if you haven't seen this all before. This film, like many others, working a worked-to-death formula, falls flat on its face.″

References

External links 
 

1999 films
1990s Hindi-language films
Films scored by Rajesh Roshan